The 1974 European Athletics Indoor Championships were held on 9 and 10 March 1974 in Gothenburg, Sweden at the Scandinavium.

The track used for the championships was 196 metres long.

Medal summary

Men

Women

Medal table

Participating nations

 (2)
 (6)
 (11)
 (15)
 (5)
 (28)
 (6)
 (20)
 (10)
 (7)
 (7)
 (1)
 (1)
 (11)
 (1)
 (8)
 (6)
 (21)
 (10)
 (31)
 (7)
 (23)
 (3)
 (21)
 (2)

References
 Results - men at GBR Athletics
 Results - women at GBR Athletics
 Detailed results at Die Leichtatletik-Statistik-Seite
 EAA

 
European Athletics Indoor Championships
European Indoor Championships
International athletics competitions hosted by Sweden
1974 in Swedish sport
March 1974 sports events in Europe
1970s in Gothenburg
International sports competitions in Gothenburg
Athletics in Gothenburg